The Trentino-Alto Adige/Südtirol regional election of 1998 took place on 22 November 1998.

The South Tyrolean People's Party (SVP) and the Daisy Civic List (Civica) resulted the two most voted parties at the regional level. The SVP retained its outright majority in South Tyrol, while the Civica became the largest party in Trentino. After the election, the two parties formed a coalition at the regional level. Luis Durnwalder (SVP) and Lorenzo Dellai (Civica) were sworn in at the head of the two Provinces, respectively, while the Democrats of the Left and the Trentino Tyrolean Autonomist Party shared the Regional administration.

Results

Regional Council

Source: Trentino-Alto Adige/Südtirol Region

Province of Trento

Source: Trentino-Alto Adige/Südtirol Region

Province of Bolzano

Source: Province of Bolzano

1998 elections in Italy
Elections in Trentino-Alto Adige/Südtirol